Rod Underhill (October 7, 1953 – September 7, 2018) was an American attorney and author who wrote books about the Internet and MP3 technology and was also a founder of MP3.com. His books include The Complete Idiot's Guide to MP3 and The Complete Idiot's Guide to Making Millions on the Internet, each written with Nat Gertler .

Biography
Rod Underhill was born on October 7, 1953 and practiced law in California from 1980 until 1998, when he cofounded MP3.com.

After leaving MP3.com, Underhill served as a law professor at Thomas Jefferson School of Law and in 2008 was awarded a Webby Award (People's Voice Award) for his work as cofounder of Podlinez.com.

Underhill lived in Julian, California with his wife and two children. He died from heart failure during a cancer treatment.

Selected books
The Complete Idiot's Guide to MP3 (with Nat Gertler), Que Books, 2000.
The Complete Idiot's Guide to Making Millions on the Internet (with Nat Gertler), Que Books, 2001.
MP3: Musica En Internet Facil (Spanish language version of Guide to MP3,) Que Books, 2001 .
MP3 (French language variation of Guide to MP3), Campuspress (Paris, France), 2000.
MP3 : muzyka w Internecie nie tylko dla orłów (Polish language edition of Guide to MP3) Intersoftland,  (Warsaw, Poland), 2000

References

1953 births
Living people
American computer businesspeople
Place of birth missing (living people)
American lawyers